The Roman tomb called mausoleum of Fabara or mausoleum of Lucius Aemilius Lupus is located on the left bank of Matarranya River near the village of Fabara, in the province of Zaragoza.

Quite possibly the monument of such type best-preserved of the entire peninsula. The tomb is located in an area with a high density of rural Roman remains, with several archaeological sites and Roman villas. Nearby have been located signs of other buildings of the same type.

It is a construction of the 2nd century AD.

The mausoleum had gone virtually unnoticed by scholars. It was not until 1874 that were officially reported to the administration (in this case, the Royal Academy of History) of its existence. The building was owned by various individuals, until in 1942 it was acquired by the State. Earlier, in 1931 had been declared historical artistic monument. Its state of conservation is enviable.

Description

It is a rectangular building, of  coated with sandstone, without mortar; the blocks are locked with metal parts. Is perfectly oriented along the cardinal points, with the main facade and entrance from east. Is a temple of classical type, the type known as prostyle, i.e. the facade consists of four columns: two between the side walls, and two attached to them. The blank walls are decorated with pilasters, two in the rear corners and two more in the middle of the side walls.

On the walls and columns of the facade, of Tuscan order, stood the entablature decorated outside. This entablature had in its front an inscription, now lost, made of bronze letters nailed. Of these disappeared letters have remained only the signs of its existence in the stone. On the sides and rear, are reliefs with floral motifs and garlands.

Above the entablature are placed two pediments, one at the front, badly damaged, but still retains the inscription, thanks to that has been identified in the building. The second pediment, in the back, is smooth and better preserved.

Between the columns and the front gate, is the pronao. The interior cell is covered with a barrel vault. A stairs give access to the fourth burial beneath the building and also covered with a barrel vault.

In the pediment is the inscription that can be easily read yet:
L' A  MILI  LVPI
It is assumed that between the A and M would be required to place an E. Above there traces of have contained nailed metal letters, easily a D and a M. As full registration might have been:
D. M.L'AEMILI   LVPI
That could translate: «To the manes gods of Lucius Aemilius Lupus», a character until now unknown.

External links 

 Mausoleu romà de Fabara (in Catalan)

Fabara
Buildings and structures in the Province of Zaragoza
History of Aragon
Buildings and structures completed in the 2nd century
2nd-century establishments in the Roman Empire
Bien de Interés Cultural landmarks in the Province of Zaragoza
Tourist attractions in Aragon